Mårådalsfjellet is a mountain in Skjåk Municipality in Innlandet county, Norway. The mountain is surrounded by several other notable mountains including Skridulaupen and Sandåtinden to the northeast, Raudeggi to the north, Kvitlenova to the northwest, Leirvasshøi to the southwest, and Dyringshøi and Søverhøi to the southeast. The Tystigbreen glacier lies just west of the mountain. 

See also
List of mountains of Norway

References

Skjåk
Mountains of Innlandet